Pazevar Rural District is a rural district (dehestan) in Rudbast District, Babolsar County, Mazandaran Province, Iran. At the 2006 census, its population was 17,727, in 4,648 families. The rural district has 22 villages.

References 

Rural Districts of Mazandaran Province
Babolsar County